City 42 is a Lahore-based news channel which broadcasts news and information about latest happenings and events in the city of Lahore in Punjab, Pakistan. The channel was founded in 2009 and is owned by Mohsin Naqvi who is the founder of City News Group. Naqvi is politically affiliated with Chaudhrys of Gujrat through marriage.

The channel broadcasts a variety of programs in Urdu and English which span from current affairs to general infotainment.

History
The channel was founded in 2009 by a Pakistani media mogul, Mohsin Naqvi, as C42. The channel name was based on landline telephone dialing code of Lahore, 042.

See also 

 List of news channels in Pakistan

References

External links
 City 42 - Official website
 24 News HD - Official website
 24 News Urdu - Official website
 Rohi
 NNB Networks - News Website

Television channels and stations established in 2009
Television stations in Lahore
Television stations in Pakistan
24-hour television news channels in Pakistan